Balčiūnas is the masculine form of a Lithuanian family name. Its feminine forms  are: Balčiūnienė (married woman or widow) and Balčiūnaitė (unmarried woman).

The surname may refer to:
Egidijus Balčiūnas (b. 1975), Lithuanian sprint canoe racer
Gintaras Balčiūnas (b. 1964), Lithuanian lawyer, Minister of Justice  
Linas Balčiūnas (b. 1978), Lithuanian road and track cyclist

Lithuanian-language surnames